France competed at the 2011 World Championships in Athletics from August 27 to September 4 in Daegu, South Korea.

Team selection

The French Athletics Federation (Fédération Française d'Athlétisme)
announced the final team of 46 athletes to represent the country
in the event, led by sprinter Christophe Lemaitre and pole vaulter Renaud Lavillenie.

The following athletes appeared on the preliminary Entry List, but not on the Official Start List of the specific event, resulting in total number of 39 competitors:

Medalists
The following competitors from France won medals at the Championships

Results

Men

Decathlon

Women

Heptathlon

References

External links
Official local organising committee website
Official IAAF competition website

Nations at the 2011 World Championships in Athletics
World Championships in Athletics
France at the World Championships in Athletics